The women's doubles competition at the 2010 Asian Games in Guangzhou was held on 18 November 2010 at Tianhe Bowling Hall.

Schedule
All times are China Standard Time (UTC+08:00)

Results 

 China was awarded bronze because of no three-medal sweep per country rule.

References 

Results at ABF Website
Bowling Digital

External links
Bowling Site of 2010 Asian Games

Women's doubles